Nangui Lu Station  is a metro station on the Guangfo Line (FMetro Line 1) and will be an interchange station between the Guangfo Line (FMetro Line 1) and FMetro Line 6.  It is located under the junction of Guilan Road, Nangui East Road and Guiping Road in Guicheng Subdistrict in the Nanhai District of Foshan. The station is situated in the commercial area of the Nanhai District and was completed on 3November 2010.

Station layout

Exits

References

Foshan Metro stations
Nanhai District
Railway stations in China opened in 2010
Guangzhou Metro stations